Tire Toki Mahallesi station, officially designated as KM 91+300, is a railway station on the Çatal-Tire railway just north of Tire, Turkey. The station was opened in January 2014 to service the new TOKİ housing projects built nearby.

References

Railway stations in İzmir Province
Railway stations opened in 2014
2014 establishments in Turkey
Tire District